Arman Sadeghi (born June 26, 1977) is an American entrepreneur. He is known for being a professional speaker and the founder of All Green Electronics Recycling.
He spoke at TedxNewportCoast in 2012 on the topic the negative health impact of electronic recycling.

Career

Sadeghi began his career by dropping out of high school at the age of 15. Throughout his career, Arman worked with different companies and founded several of them related to various fields. Notable among them include;

All Green Electronics Recycling

All Green Electronics Recycling is a full service provider of Electronics Recycling, IT Asset management and Data Destruction Services headquartered in Tustin, California. He founded it in 2008.

References

1977 births
21st-century American businesspeople
Living people
People from Orange County, California
University of California, Berkeley alumni